The 1888–89 season was the first season of competitive league football in the history of English football club Wolverhampton Wanderers. They played in the inaugural season of the newly formed Football League. The club finished in third place in the league, and as runners-up in the FA Cup.

The team scored the first goal in Football League history when they took the lead against Aston Villa on the league's opening day. This match, as with all other home games for Wolves, was staged at Dudley Road in Wolverhampton, the only league campaign in which the club have not been based at Molineux.

Results

Football League

A total of twelve teams competed in the inaugural Football League in the 1888–89 season. Each team would play every other team twice, once at their stadium, and once at the opposition's. Two points were awarded to teams for each win, one point per draw, and none for defeats. 

Final table

Results by round

FA Cup

Players

References

Wolverhampton Wanderers F.C. seasons
Wolverhampton Wanderers